The N53 road is a national secondary road in Ireland, running from junction 17 of the M1 just outside Dundalk, County Louth to the N2 bypass of Castleblayney, County Monaghan.

Route
The official definition of the N53 is:
"Between its junction with N1 at Newtownbalregan in the county of Louth and the boundary between the county of Louth and the county of Armagh at Rassan via Hackball’s Cross all in the county of Louth

and

between the boundary between the county of Armagh and the county of Monaghan at Ballynacarry Bridge and its junction with N2 at Tullyvin via Annadrumman and Connaburry all in the county of Monaghan."

A short section of the route passes through Cullaville, County Armagh, where it is classified as the A37.

See also
Roads in Ireland 
Motorways in the Republic of Ireland
National primary road
Regional road

References

Roads Act 1993 (Classification of National Roads) Order 2006 – Department of Transport

National secondary roads in the Republic of Ireland
Roads in County Louth
Roads in County Monaghan